Jerry Lee Lewis: Trouble in Mind is a 2022 archival documentary film about American singer-songwriter Jerry Lee Lewis directed by Ethan Coen and edited by Tricia Cooke.

Synopsis
74 minutes long, the documentary combines pre-existing interviews with Lewis at different stages of his life and career with performance footage, and interviews with other people such as Myra Lewis Williams, his ex-wife and cousin, and country singer Mickey Gilley who was also his cousin.

Production
Coen and Cooke were approached by T-Bone Burnett during the COVID-19 pandemic with the idea of making an archival documentary with a process that could be completed at home, which was appealing at a time of widespread isolation and withdrawal from public activities. Coen described the idea as "too compelling to turn down". Cooke described it as "like a home movie project."

Reception
Peter Bradshaw in The Guardian said it was "thoroughly enjoyable" and that it "does something very few films can: it makes you grin with pleasure." The Hollywood Reporter describes "a video mixtape chock-full of performances showing how even a man who rarely wrote his own songs could earn a place in the rock’n’roll pantheon. And that’s literally all it is.. Coen makes no effort to clear up the mythology [around Lewis]…Trouble in Mind may appeal mainly to roots-rock diehards and Coen Brothers super-completists". Owen Gliebermann in Variety acknowledges Coen "uses almost nothing but old performance and TV-interview clips" but that he "combines them artfully, syncing them to his own pleasure centers—and ours."

Release
The film was shown at the 2022 Cannes Film Festival on May 22, 2022.

See also
Great Balls of Fire! – 1989 biopic

References

External links
Rotten Tomatoes
 
Metacritic

2022 films
2022 documentary films
2020s English-language films
Documentary films about rock music and musicians
Documentary films about singers
Films directed by the Coen brothers
Collage film
Works by Ethan Coen
A24 (company) films